Pretz-en-Argonne Aerodrome,  was a temporary World War I airfield in France.  It was located near the commune of Pretz-en-Argonne, in the Meuse department in Lorraine in northeastern France.

Overview
The airfield might have been initially built by/for French Air Service as two of its "escadrilles" were stationed in Pretz until 13 September 1918. American 88th Aero Squadron spent a short spell in Pretz, 14–20 September, before go back to Souilly Aerodrome to be part of the newly formed III Corps Observation Group. The next day, a French escadrille BR 236 arrived at PRetz, from where it flew heavy artillery mission for the American First Army until the end of war - it left the field on 25 November.
Despite its very short time of use by the American Air Service, le field became known as Bregnet Field. The precise location of the airfield is undetermined, and presumably after the war, the airfield was abandoned and returned to agricultural use.

Known units assigned
 88th Aero Squadron (Observation) 14–20 September 1918

See also

 List of Air Service American Expeditionary Force aerodromes in France

References

 Series "D", Volume 2, Squadron histories,. Gorrell's History of the American Expeditionary Forces Air Service, 1917–1919, National Archives, Washington, D.C.

External links

World War I sites of the United States
World War I airfields in France